Snarf is a fictional character featured in the ThunderCats franchise.

1985 series

In the 1985 version of ThunderCats, the character is an elderly Snarf, whose real name is Osbert. However, he hates his real name but he couldn't tell why. Snarf's friends are Jaga, Tygra, Panthro, Cheetara, Wilykit, Wilykat and even Lion-O. Snarf served as a nursemaid and protector for Lion-O when he was a boy. After Lion-O grew up, Snarf found that often Lion-O did not want to have him "mothering", or protecting him. Still, Snarf has remained loyal to Lion-O and the other ThunderCats. At times, he does come through in a pinch with an idea and takes action when it is needed. Even though not a fighter by skill or nature, Snarf is very agile. He also can communicate with other animals on Third Earth to enlist their help in his tasks, and once even tricked the Ancient Spirits of Evil into giving him a power up to become Snarf-Ra. Catch phrase "SNARF!" Often refers to himself in third person. His enemies are Mumm-Ra, Ancient Spirits of Evil, The Mutants, The Lunataks, The Berserkers, and Grune the Destroyer.

2011 series

In the 2011 cartoon, Snarf is the devoted cat-like pet of Lion-O. Unlike his predecessor, Snarf is primarily quadruped and does not speak beyond the occasional murmured word, although later episodes do feature him making his characteristic "SNARF-SNARF" noise, and on occasion "SNARFITY-SNARF-SNARF" noise. Lion-O, at least, appears to be capable of understanding him.

ThunderCats Roar

In the 2020 cartoon, Snarf is re-imagined as a robotic, cat-like pet of Lion-O, equipped with multiple tools. He is again a quadruped, but does not speak at all.

Reception
The original version of Snarf received a mostly mixed to negative reception by both critics and fans, who perceived the character as being shrill or "annoying". The 2011 counterpart, who is less human-like, has been more favorably received by critics and fans, who perceived his antics to be more "cute" than grating.

In other media
Snarf was also featured in South Park's season 11 series of episodes about "Imaginationland", and appeared as a hand puppet in the Adult Swim short film, Too Many Cooks.

References

Anthropomorphic animal characters
Fictional cats
Fictional male domestic workers
Fictional robots
Male characters in animated series
Television characters introduced in 1985
Television sidekicks
ThunderCats